The Ford Transit Courier is a leisure activity vehicle marketed by Ford of Europe. Making its debut as a model of 2014 at the 2013 Geneva Motor Show, the Transit Courier is the smallest vehicle of the product range of the Ford Transit. Deriving its underpinnings from the Ford Fiesta, the model line is the first van based on the Fiesta, since the discontinuation of the Ford Courier in August 2002.

In contrast to the Transit and Transit Connect, the Transit Courier is marketed primarily by Ford of Europe, and is not marketed in North America. The passenger version of the Transit Courier (outside the United Kingdom) is known as the Ford Tourneo Courier, in line with other Ford passenger vans sold globally.

All examples of the Transit/Tourneo Courier are assembled by Ford Otosan in Kocaeli, Turkey, alongside the full size Transit and mid size Transit Custom.

Overview 

While sharing the name of the full size Transit and Transit Custom, the Transit Courier shares the global B platform with the Ford Fiesta and B-Max. Its front styling is similar to the Fiesta, while its dashboard is shared with the B-Max.

Inside, a docking port option in the dashboard allows electronic devices such as mobile phones, MP3 players or portable navigation systems to connect. An option includes Sync Wizard which integrates voice control of the entertainment and communications system with connected devices.

Like the B-Max, the Tourneo Courier passenger van is a five passenger vehicle. The rear seat is a 60/40 split bench seat. The outboard rear seats have Isofix (child seat) brackets as well as a connection point with integrated USB and AUX port fitted as standard.

Behind the rear seat, an adjustable height luggage rack divides the cargo space so that both light and heavy cargo can be stowed separately.

Cargo handling

Two sliding side doors, six lashing eyes and mounting points in the body for the installation of shelves or installation systems offer many variations for commercial use. To increase cargo space, the vehicle is fitted with a folding passenger seat and an optional grid partition between the cockpit and cargo area.

Optionally, LED lighting is available for the cargo area.

Powertrain
The base engine for the Transit/Tourneo Courier is the 1.0L 3-cylinder EcoBoost engine producing . Alongside the petrol engine are two diesels: A 1.5L Duratorq producing  and a 1.6L Duratorq producing . On all three engines, Ford offers their start stop system to reduce fuel consumption.

External links
 Ford Transit Courier (Ford UK) 
 Ford Transit Courier (German)
 Ford Transit Courier (Ford México) 
 Ford Tourneo Courier (German)
 Ford Transit Courier, Auto Bild - Vorstellung

Transit Courier
Cars introduced in 2014
Vans
Mini MPVs
Ford B3 platform
Front-wheel-drive vehicles